Oludiran "Diran" Adebayo FRSL (born 30 August 1968) is a British novelist, cultural critic and academic, best known for his tales of London and the lives of African diasporans. His work has been characterised by its interest in multiple cultural identities, subcultures, and its distinctive, "musical" use of language. His fans include the writer Zadie Smith, who has praised him for his "humanness", arguing that he is one of a few English writers who "trade in both knowledge and feeling". In 2002 The Times Literary Supplement named him as one of the Best Young British Novelists.

Education and career
Born Oludiran Adebayo in London in 1968, to Nigerian parents, Adebayo won a Major Scholarship when he was 12 to Malvern College, where he boarded as an adolescent, and is an Oxford University Law graduate. Among his friends at Wadham College, Oxford, were the writers Monica Ali and Hari Kunzru, while the Afro-Futurist critic and theorist Kodwo Eshun, whom Adebayo cites in his Acknowledgements to Some Kind of Black, was another university contemporary.

Adebayo's debut novel, Some Kind of Black, centred on the youthful adventures of its protagonist, Dele, was one of the first to articulate a British-born African perspective, and it won him numerous awards, including the Writers' Guild of Great Britain's New Writer of the Year Award, the Author's Club First Novel Award, the 1996 Saga Prize, and a Betty Trask Award. It was also longlisted for the Booker Prize, serialised on British radio and is now a Virago Modern Classic. "It is difficult to discuss the book without talking in terms of its uniqueness – and without resorting to superlatives...a tremendously rich, subtle and nuanced read", said The Scotsman, while The Times called him a "gloriously capable and confident writer".  

His follow-up book, the fable My Once Upon A Time, set in a near-future London-like western city, fused noir with Yoruba folklore to striking effect, and solidified his reputation as a groundbreaker. The book uses the song "Heaven and Hell" by Chef Raekwon of the Wu-Tang Clan as a thread running through the novel. Much attention was again given to his wit and to the deft deployment of different registers and styles of language. "Diran Adebayo confirms his promise as a writer of vibrant originality....This is a book that sings: its prose, a giddy mixture of English and patois, Runyonesque flights of descriptive fantasy and the musical cadences of street-slang, is by turns rhapsodic, exhilarating and poignant," said The Telegraph.

In 2000, Vienna University awarded Adebayo the $60,000 Abraham Woursell stipend, a prize for young noteworthy European writers. In 2004 he co-edited New Writing 12, the British Council's annual anthology of British and Commonwealth literature, with Blake Morrison and Jane Rogers. In 2005, Adebayo was the first Guest Director of the Cheltenham Literature Festival and wrote the documentary Out of Africa for BBC Television. In 2009, Adebayo donated the short story "Calculus" to Oxfam's "Ox-Tales" project, four collections of UK stories written by 38 authors. His story was published in the "Air" collection.

In 2006, Adebayo was the International Writing Fellow at Southampton University, before a residency at Georgetown University.
  
Adebayo had worked as Senior News Reporter at The Voice newspaper and as a reporter on BBC Television before his manuscript for Some Kind of Black won the Saga Prize. He was formerly a columnist for the now defunct New Nation newspaper, and is one of the leading commentators on Race in Britain, as well as writing on arts and sports for newspapers such as The Guardian, The Independent and New Statesman magazine.

In 2017, he was one of 20 people to have their portraits taken by Oxford University for permanent display, as part of its "Diversifying Portraiture" initiative, in recognition of his "achievements and contributions to the University and to the literary world".

Adebayo is a Fellow of the Royal Society of Literature and of the Santa Maddalena Foundation, and a former trustee of The Book Trust and the Arts Council of England.

He lives in London and is the younger brother of the writer, journalist, publisher and broadcaster Dotun Adebayo.

Publications
 Some Kind of Black (1997)
 My Once Upon A Time (2001)
 New Writing 12 (co-editor, 2004)

Notes

References
John Cunningham, "Of Wodehouse and Wood Green" (interview), The Guardian, 22 September 2001.
Alison Roberts, "Don't expect failure", Evening Standard interview, 11 December 2003.

External links 

Kieran Meeke, Metro interview, 27 October 2009.

1968 births
Living people
English people of Nigerian descent
English people of Yoruba descent
Fellows of the Royal Society of Literature
People educated at Malvern College
Alumni of Wadham College, Oxford
Black British writers
20th-century English novelists
21st-century English novelists
Writers from London
Yoruba writers